Bear Creek Township is a township in Luzerne County, Pennsylvania,  United States. The population was 2,752 at the 2020 census.

History

First settlers
Bear Creek was first settled in the late 18th century. The first log cabin was built in 1786 (about nine miles from Wilkes-Barre). Bear Creek, with its abundance of trees, became the lumber king of Luzerne County. The first sawmill was built in 1800 by Oliver Helme. Many more sawmills were later constructed throughout the 19th century.

Township
Bear Creek was later incorporated as a township; it was carved from territory taken from Wilkes-Barre, Pittston, Bucks, Plains, and Jenkins (in 1856). By 1890, the community had a population of 343.

In 1961, the Bear Creek Dam was constructed in the southern portion of the township. The dam spans the Lehigh River at its confluence with the tributary Bear Creek. Although the dam was originally constructed for flood management, its reservoir has since become a popular recreational area for fishing, kayaking, and boating. In 1963, the dam was renamed after a United States Congressman (Francis E. Walter).

In 1993, Bear Creek Village broke away from the township and became a borough. Today, the township is made up of several small villages, thick forests, lakes, and streams.

Air disaster 

Bear Creek Township was the site of a plane crash on May 21, 2000; it crashed while attempting to land at the Wilkes-Barre/Scranton International Airport. As described by the BBC, the crash occurred in a "wooded area" of the township, near the intersection of Bear Creek Boulevard (PA-Route 115) and the Northeast Extension of the Pennsylvania Turnpike.

The accident killed the pilot as well as all 19 passengers. NTSB investigation ruled that the crash was probably due to low fuel. The incident spurred an FBI investigation and made news across the globe. Passenger safety in the aviation field became a major issue of the 2000 U.S. presidential election.

21st century
The Bear Creek Wind Power Project began commercial operation in 2006. The wind farm consists of twelve Gamesa 2.0 MW wind turbines.

Government

List of Bear Creek Township Supervisors:

Geography
Bear Creek Township is the largest municipality (by total area) in Luzerne County. It is drained by both the Susquehanna and Lehigh rivers. The Francis E. Walter Dam and Reservoir is located in the southernmost section of the township (along the Lehigh River). The township's villages include Forest Park, Llewellyn Corners (also in Plains Township), and Pleasant View Summit.

Bear Creek's numbered routes are Interstate 476 (the Northeast Extension of the Pennsylvania Turnpike) and Route 115. These two routes are connected by the Wilkes-Barre turnpike interchange just north of Forest Park. 115 connects Wilkes-Barre with Monroe County. Other local roads of note include Laurel Run Road, Meadow Run Road, Thornhurst Road, and White Haven Road.

The township has a warm-summer humid continental climate (Dfb) and average monthly temperatures at the Turnpike interchange range from 23.1 °F in January to 69.1 °F in July.  The hardiness zone is mostly 5b except at lower elevations in the NW where it is 6a.

Demographics

As of the census of 2000, there were 2,580 people, 997 households, and 754 families residing in the township.  The population density was 39.0 people per square mile (15.0/km2).  There were 1,216 housing units at an average density of 18.4/sq mi (7.1/km2).  The racial makeup of the township was 98.88% White, 0.31% African American, 0.04% Native American, 0.31% Asian, 0.08% from other races, and 0.39% from two or more races. Hispanic or Latino of any race were 0.78% of the population.

There were 997 households, out of which 29.3% had children under the age of 18 living with them, 64.0% were married couples living together, 6.7% had a female householder with no husband present, and 24.3% were non-families. 20.5% of all households were made up of individuals, and 9.2% had someone living alone who was 65 years of age or older.  The average household size was 2.55 and the average family size was 2.95.

In the township the population was spread out, with 21.7% under the age of 18, 6.0% from 18 to 24, 25.7% from 25 to 44, 29.2% from 45 to 64, and 17.4% who were 65 years of age or older.  The median age was 43 years. For every 100 females, there were 104.4 males.  For every 100 females age 18 and over, there were 101.1 males.

The median income for a household in the township was $43,900, and the median income for a family was $49,107. Males had a median income of $36,726 versus $26,053 for females. The per capita income for the township was $19,427.  About 4.6% of families and 5.9% of the population were below the poverty line, including 5.1% of those under age 18 and 5.2% of those age 65 or over.

Gallery

References

External links

Townships in Luzerne County, Pennsylvania
Townships in Pennsylvania